The Lower and Higher Longbeak barrows (also known as the Widemouth Bay tumulus) are a scheduled monument located north of Widemouth Bay in Cornwall. The two round barrows are Neolithic funerary monuments, built sometime around 2400–1500 BC.

They are designated as "two bowl barrows, one 220m east of Lower Longbeak and the other 320m east of Higher Longbeak" by Historic England. According to a field survey in 1977, "The southern mound measures 14m in diameter and is 1.1m high. It is steep-sided with a central hollow, possibly the result of antiquarian excavation although no details are known. The barrow has views across Widemouth Sand. The northern barrow mound is 16m in diameter and 0.7m high".

They are protected under the Ancient Monuments and Archaeological Areas Act 1979.

See also

 Widemouth Bay
 Scheduled monuments in Cornwall

References

External links
 PastScape Monument No's: 31703 and 31706.
  - Heritage Category: Scheduling, Location: Marhamchurch, Cornwall.
  Tumulus (NR) Ordnance Survey

Monuments and memorials in Cornwall